Mangroviflexus is a Gram-positive, non-spore-forming, rod-shaped and obligately anaerobic genus of bacteria from the family of Marinilabiliaceae with one known species (Mangroviflexus xiamenensis). Mangroviflexus xiamenensis has been isolated from mangrove sediments from the Dongzhai Port in China.

References

Bacteria genera
Bacteroidia
Monotypic bacteria genera